was an important figure during the early Edo period in Japan. As the Daimyo of Takaoka Domain, he played a role in the persecution and eradication of early Christians in Japan. He was commissioner for the Dutch East India Company in Nagasaki.

He is thought to have risen to prominence. In his post of Inspector General (ōmetsuke, 大目付), Masashige had many encounters with the Dutch East India Company, who recorded much about him.

Inoue was played by Issey Ogata in Martin Scorsese’s film Silence (2016).

References

External links
Blussé, Leonard (2003). "The grand inquisitor Inoue Chikugano Kami Masashige, spin doctor of the Tokugawa Bakafu", Bulletin of Portuguese/Japanese Studies, vol. 7. Universidade Nova de Lisboa p.23-43 http://www.redalyc.org/pdf/361/36100702.pdf

Fudai daimyo
1585 births
1661 deaths